Paul D. Hubbard (1871–1946) was a deaf American football player who is credited with inventing the modern huddle. He played football at Gallaudet University from 1892 to 1895.

Early life
Hubbard graduated from the Colorado School for the Deaf and the Blind in 1889. Hubbard attended the Gallaudet University in 1892. As the quarterback of the team, he invented the huddle.

Career
After his time at Gallaudet, Hubbard returned to Olathe, Kansas as a teacher and coach at the Kansas School for the Deaf. Hubbard initiated the school's football program in 1899. He coached at Kansas School for the Deaf for many years.  He eventually relinquished his titled as coach and finished the remainder of his years as a teacher and served as the school's first athletic director. He retired in 1942 after 43 years at the school.

Personal life
Hubbard married in 1901 to Caroline Bownson. They had two hearing children, a son and a daughter. Their daughter, Pauline, died at a young age, and the son went on to attend the Kansas Military Academy.

References

1871 births
1946 deaths
American football quarterbacks
Gallaudet Bison football players
High school football coaches in Kansas
Sportspeople from Olathe, Kansas
American deaf people